WD repeat domain 83 is a protein that in humans is encoded by the WDR83 gene.

Function

This gene encodes a member of the WD-40 protein family. The protein is proposed to function as a molecular scaffold for various multimeric protein complexes. The protein associates with several components of the extracellular signal-regulated kinase (ERK) pathway, and promotes ERK activity in response to serum or other signals. The protein also interacts with egl nine homolog 3 (EGLN3, also known as PHD3) and regulates expression of hypoxia-inducible factor 1, and has been purified as part of the spliceosome. Alternative splicing results in multiple transcript variants.

References

Further reading